The discography of the Japanese singer-songwriter Mari Hamada consists of twenty-four studio albums, seventeen compilation albums, and twenty-five singles released since 1983.

Albums

Studio albums

International releases

Live albums

Compilations

Box sets

Singles

Regular singles

Promotional singles

International singles

Other recordings
As a featured artist

Videography

Music video albums

Live video albums

Footnotes

References

External links
 

Discography
Discographies of Japanese artists
Pop music discographies
Heavy metal discographies